The 2004 Montana Democratic presidential primary was held on June 8 in the U.S. state of Montana as one of the Democratic Party's statewide nomination contests ahead of the 2004 presidential election.

Results

References

Montana
Democratic primary
2004